Two species of lizard are named  Stolzmann's Pacific iguana:

Liolaemus reichei
Liolaemus stolzmanni